Anochanus sinensis is a species of sea urchin of the family Cassiduloida. Their armour is covered with spines. It is placed in the genus Anochanus and lives in the sea. Anochanus sinensis was first scientifically described in 1868 by Adolph Grube.

See also 
Anametalia regularis (Clark, 1925)
Anametalia sternaloides (Bolau, 1874)
Antrechinus drygalskii Mortensen

References 

Cassiduloida
Animals described in 1868
Taxa named by Adolph Eduard Grube